Hemyock railway station served the village of Hemyock, Devonshire, England, from 1876 to 1963 on the Culm Valley Light Railway.

History 
The station was opened on 29 May 1876 by the Culm Valley Light Railway. It was situated on the east side of B3391. A refreshment room opened in 1878 in an attempt to attract more passengers. This didn't work, however, and the refreshment room became a carriage shed and ended up as a poultry store. The station had two sidings, one serving a cattle dock to the south and the other running behind the station. Two further sidings served a goods shed and an engine shed. A ground frame controlled access to these. The station was refurbished in 1932; the goods shed and engine shed were removed and the cattle dock siding was extended into the dairy siding to the north. The station closed to passengers on 9 September 1963 and closed to goods traffic on 6 September 1965. One of the sidings that served the dairy remained open until 1 November 1975.

References 

Disused railway stations in Devon
Railway stations in Great Britain opened in 1876
Railway stations in Great Britain closed in 1964
1876 establishments in England
1963 disestablishments in England